Luzit (lit. Almond Tree) is a moshav in central Israel. Located between Beit Shemesh and Kiryat Gat, it falls under the jurisdiction of Mateh Yehuda Regional Council.

History
The village was established in 1955 by Sephardic Jewish immigrants and refugees from North Africa, led by Shalom de Palenzuela Levi-Kahana and was initially named Dir Duban Bet after the depopulated Arab village of Deir al-Dubban. It was later renamed Luzit after almond trees, which are common in the area.

References

Moshavim
Populated places established in 1955
Populated places in Jerusalem District
1955 establishments in Israel
North African-Jewish culture in Israel